Alley Cat Rescue is an organization in Mount Rainier, Maryland, that works to protect cats through rescue, rehabilitation and adoption locally in the states of California, Maryland, Virginia, and the Washington, D.C., area using trap–neuter–return for feral cats; as well as providing national and international resources for cat caretakers.

Founding

The organization was founded in 1997, when President Louise Holton moved on after co-founding Alley Cat Allies.

Programs

Low cost spay-neuter clinic
The organization offers low cost spay and neuter services for cats to low income residents of the states of Maryland, Virginia, and Washington, D.C.

Feral Cat Spay Day
On May 27, 2010, veterinarians across the U.S. were encouraged to participate in free or low-cost clinics for feral cats. Over 150 vets participated, including those in Canada and South Africa. The event has continued each year, most recently on May 27, 2014.

Trap–neuter–return 
The organization offers trap–neuter–return services for community cats (feral and stray) in their locations of Maryland, Virginia and Washington, D.C., including a feral cat clinic with low cost spay and neuter services by appointment.

Adoption
Adoption services are offered for about 250 cats and kittens a year, in a store-front location in Silver Spring, Maryland. "We find homes for abandoned, stray, and relinquished cats; we also socialize feral kittens and work to find barn homes for feral cats."

Resources
Online resources are offered about feral cats, alternatives to declawing, and cat health, and information on advocating for cats. The organization maintains a list of "Cat Action Teams" who work to help feral cats all over the U.S.

International outreach
In 2007, the organization helped organize a free spay-neuter clinic for cats and dogs in Puerto Vallarta, Mexico.

In 2008, the organization gathered 12,000 signatures prior to the Beijing Winter Olympics and sent the petitions to the International Olympic Committee to encourage them not to host the games in countries that "clean their streets" of stray animals in preparation for the Olympics.

The organization is also working to help save the African wildcat, and to help feral cats in South Africa.

Awards
The organization's publications have won several awards:
In 2002, ACR's newsletter, Alley Cat Mews, and handbook, Feral Cat Colony Management, each won a Certificate of Excellence and a Muse Medallion from the Cat Writers' Association.
In 2007, Alley Cat Mews won a Muse Medallion from the Cat Writers' Association. 
In 2011, An Army of Ordinary People, an article by Maggie Funkhouser published in ''Alley Cat Mews, was awarded a Certificate of Excellence from the Cat Writers' Association.

References

External links
Official Website
Free Feral Spay Day List of Participating Vets

Animal charities based in the United States
Charities based in Maryland
Domestic cat welfare organizations
Trap–neuter–return organizations